Baron Teviot, of Burghclere in the County of Southampton, is a title in the Peerage of the United Kingdom. It was created in 1940 for Charles Kerr, who had previously represented the Montrose Burghs in the House of Commons, and served as Chief Whip for the National Liberal Party, and government whip and Comptroller of the Household in the National Government. He later served as Chairman of the National Liberals. Kerr was a grandson of Lord Charles Lennox Kerr, fourth son of William Kerr, 6th Marquess of Lothian.  the title is held by his only son, the second Baron, who succeeded in 1968. He is a genealogist.

From 1987 to 1990 the second Baron Teviot served as President of the Institute of Transport Management.

Barons Teviot (1940)
Charles Iain Kerr, 1st Baron Teviot (1874–1968)
Charles John Kerr, 2nd Baron Teviot (b. 1934)

The heir apparent and sole heir to the title is the present holder's only son the Hon. Charles Robert Kerr (b. 1971)

Arms

See also
Marquess of Lothian
Earl of Teviot

Notes

References
 

Baronies in the Peerage of the United Kingdom
Noble titles created in 1940
Noble titles created for UK MPs